Negrinho River may refer to:

 Negrinho River (Mafra, Santa Catarina)
 Negrinho River (Mato Grosso do Sul)

See also 
 Neagra River (disambiguation)
 Negrea River (disambiguation)